The Sugamuxi Province is a subregion of the Colombian Department of Boyacá. The subregion is formed by 13 municipalities.

Etymology 
The name of the province comes from Sugamuxi, the last iraca of the Muisca and means in Chibcha: "Dwelling of the Sun".

Subdivision 
Sugamuxi Province comprises 13 municipalities:

References 

Provinces of Boyacá Department
Province